Great! Romance (stylized as GREAT! romance) is a British free-to-air TV channel owned by Narrative Entertainment UK Limited that launched 10 September 2019 as Sony Movies Classic, replacing True Movies. The launch began with a temporary seasonal replacement called Sony Movies Christmas, lasting from 10 September 2019 to 7 January 2020. The channel is dedicated to romance movies from the 40s to the 00s.

The brand voice of the channel is British voice over artist Ben Neidle, who voices the promos and continuity links.

History 
Prior to the 10 September 2019 launch of Sony Movies Classic, the channel was known as True Movies. This channel topped all the film channels in August 2005. The first time a Christmas replacement of the channel was made was in 2013. On 24 July 2019, it was announced that True Movies, Along with Movies4Men and True Entertainment would be closed and replaced by this channel from 10 September, after the temporary Sony Movies Christmas replacement on 10 September 2019

Sony Movies Christmas returned on 24 September 2020, and ran until 4 January 2021.

Due to Narrative Capital acquiring SPT's full UK portfolio on 14 May 2021, the channel was rebranded as Great! Movies Classic on 25 May 2021.

As per its time under Sony ownership, the channel becomes a 'Christmas movie' channel over the last quarter of the broadcasting year. In 2021 it was rebranded for the first time as Great! Movies Christmas, with a seasonal film schedule running from 23 September 2021 until 4 January 2022. Great! Movies Christmas returned again for the Christmas 2022 season a few weeks earlier on 8 September 2022, 108 days before Christmas. This schedule continued until 2 January 2023, with the +1 channel in Greater Manchester also reflecting the change.

On 5 January 2023, Great! Movies Classic rebranded as Great! Romance showing romantic movies all day every day.

Logos

Temporary Logos

References

External links
 

English-language television stations in the United Kingdom
Movie channels in the United Kingdom
Sony Pictures Television
Television channels in the United Kingdom
Television channels and stations established in 2019